The 2004–05 Grazer AK season was the 56th season of competitive football played by Grazer AK. AK Grazer finished second in the Austrian Football Bundesliga, one point behind champions Rapid Wien.

First-team squad
Squad at end of season

Left club during season

Matches

Legend

Bundesliga

League table

Austrian Cup

UEFA Champions League

Qualifying rounds

Third qualifying round

UEFA Cup

First round

Group stage

The group stage draw was held on 5 October 2004.

Knockout phase

Round of 32

References

Notes

Grazer AK seasons
Grazer AK